Casa Grande School District 4 is a school district in Pinal County, Arizona, that serves over 7,000 students in 13 schools. The school district has received six A+ awards from the Arizona Educational Foundation since 2007.

References

External links
 
 Casa Grande School District 4 ~ Best Public Schools in Casa Grande, AZ on School Digger

School districts in Pinal County, Arizona
Casa Grande, Arizona